Union County is a county located on the central southern border of the U.S. state of Arkansas. As of the 2020 census, the population was 39,054. The county seat is El Dorado. The county was formed on November 2, 1829, and named in recognition of the citizens' petition for a new county, which said that they were petitioning "in the spirit of Union and Unity." The county is directly adjacent to the south to Union Parish in the state of Louisiana.

The El Dorado, AR Micropolitan Statistical Area includes all of Union County.

Called by boosters the "Queen City of South Arkansas", El Dorado was at the heart of the 1920s oil boom in South Arkansas. More recently, the city has been called "Arkansas's Original Boomtown," as it emphasizes its historic assets for heritage tourism. The chemical and timber industries became important during and after World War II, and still have a place in the economy.

History
Union County was formed on November 2, 1829, from portions of Clark and Hempstead counties. Areas along the waterways were originally developed for cotton plantations in the antebellum years, and planters depended on large groups of enslaved African-American workers to generate their profits.

On January 10, 1921, Dr. Samuel T. Busey hit oil with a well about a mile south of El Dorado, leading to an oil boom that attracted thousands of workers and speculators. His first well produced for fewer than two months, but by 1923, "El Dorado boasted fifty-nine oil contracting companies, thirteen oil distributors and refiners, and twenty-two oil production companies. The city was flooded with so many people that no bed space was available for them, leading to whole neighborhoods of tents and hastily constructed shacks to be erected throughout the city. The city's population reached a high of nearly 30,000 in 1925 during the boom before dropping to 16,241 by 1930 and rising to 25,000 by 1960." Oil production fell markedly in the early 1930s, in part due to companies' financial difficulties during the Great Depression. It recovered later in the decade.

During World War II, chemical plants were established in the county, but their production declined after the war. Exploitation of Arkansas forests led to growth in the timber industry in the county. Oil, chemical and timber industries are still important to the economy, although in lesser proportion.

Geography
It is the largest county by area in Arkansas. Union County, along with Columbia County, has the largest bromine reserve in the United States. The lowest point in the state of Arkansas is located on the Ouachita River in Union County and Ashley County, where it flows out of Arkansas and into Louisiana.

Adjacent counties
Ouachita County (northwest)
Calhoun County (north)
Bradley County (northeast)
Ashley County (east)
Morehouse Parish, Louisiana (southeast)
Union Parish, Louisiana (south)
Claiborne Parish, Louisiana (southwest)
Columbia County (west)

National protected area
 Felsenthal National Wildlife Refuge (part)

Demographics

2020 census

As of the 2020 United States census, there were 39,054 people, 15,726 households, and 10,562 families residing in the county.

2000 census
As of the 2000 census, there were 45,629 people, 17,989 households, and 12,646 families residing in the county. The racial makeup of the county was 66.15% White, 31.97% Black or African American, 0.24% Native American, 0.40% Asian, 0.01% Pacific Islander, 0.46% from other races, and 0.77% from two or more races. 1.14% of the population were Hispanic or Latino of any race.

There were 17,989 households, out of which 32.20% had children under the age of 18 living with them, 51.30% were married couples living together, 15.20% had a female householder with no husband present, and 29.70% were non-families. 26.90% of all households were made up of individuals, and 12.10% had someone living alone who was 65 years of age or older. The average household size was 2.48 and the average family size was 3.00.

In the county, the population was spread out, with 25.90% under the age of 18, 8.30% from 18 to 24, 27.00% from 25 to 44, 22.70% from 45 to 64, and 16.10% who were 65 years of age or older. The median age was 38 years. For every 100 females there were 91.60 males. For every 100 females age 18 and over, there were 86.00 males.

The median income for a household in the county was $29,809, and the median income for a family was $36,805. Males had a median income of $31,868 versus $19,740 for females. The per capita income for the county was $16,063. About 14.70% of families and 18.70% of the population were below the poverty line, including 25.80% of those under age 18 and 14.30% of those age 65 or over.

Government
Over the past few election cycles, Union County has trended heavily towards the GOP. The last Democrat (as of 2020) to carry this county was Bill Clinton (a native Arkansan) in 1996.

Transportation

Major highways
 Future Interstate 69
 U.S. Highway 63
 U.S. Highway 82
 U.S. Highway 167
 Highway 7
 Highway 15
 Highway 129

Airport
South Arkansas Regional Airport at Goodwin Field

Communities

Cities
Calion
El Dorado (county seat)
Strong
Huttig
Junction City
Norphlet
Smackover

Town
Felsenthal

Census-designated places
 Lawson
 Mount Holly
 Urbana

Other unincorporated communities
Lapile 
Moro Bay
Old Union
New London
Parkers Chapel

Townships

 Boone
 Cornie
 El Dorado (El Dorado)
 Franklin (Calion)
 Garner
 Harrison
 Henderson (Junction City)
 Jackson
 Johnson
 Lapile (Felsenthal, Huttig, Strong)
 Norphlet (Norphlet)
 Smackover (Smackover)
 Tubal
 Van Buren
 Wesson
 Wilmington

See also
 List of lakes in Union County, Arkansas
 National Register of Historic Places listings in Union County, Arkansas

References

External links
 Union County, Arkansas official site 
 Union County, Arkansas entry on the Encyclopedia of Arkansas History & Culture

 
1829 establishments in Arkansas Territory
Populated places established in 1829